The China Club is a retro-chic, Shanghai-style club and Michelin star restaurant in Hong Kong. It is related to the China Clubs in Singapore and Beijing but not to the clubs of the same name in New York City and Berlin, Germany. 

The China Club opened on 8 September 1991 on the top three floors (13th/14th/15th) of the old Bank of China Building in Central, Hong Kong. The restaurant serves traditional Hong Kong Chinese food.  The traditional Chinese breakfast of congee, crullers (yau tiu), and dim sum similar to those found in street stalls is served. Home-style and haute cuisine as well as western influenced Asian food like that of Tai Ping Koon are offered at lunches and dinners.

The decor is in the style of the traditional Chinese tea-house. The floors, lighting and fans are reminiscent of 1930s Shanghai.

The 13th floor is the main dining room. The 14th floor houses private rooms and the Long March Bar. The 15th floor houses private rooms in which cards and mah-jong can be played.  It also houses a library of several thousand books on China and Chinese culture.

See also
 David Tang

External links

 
 The China Club Singapore

Central, Hong Kong
Gentlemen's clubs in Hong Kong
Restaurants established in 1991
1991 establishments in Hong Kong